Stallo (formerly Maurine) is an unincorporated community (although it was incorporated from 1909 to 1933) in Neshoba County, Mississippi, USA. It is a sparsely populated rural area located in the northern part of the county near the border of Winston County. Stallo is situated roughly halfway between the town of Noxapater to the north and the community of Burnside to the south.

The community's roads were formerly largely unpaved and unmarked by signage. Now most of the roads are identified as numbered county roads and/or after the name of property owners in the area.

Churches represent the main types of institutions in the area. Local churches include:

Mt. Ary Baptist Church
Mt. Tally Missionary Baptist Church
St. Marks United Methodist Church

The community was known as Maurine from 1905 until 1908. From 1908 until 1953, Stallo had its own post office. During its 45 years of the operation, five people served as postmaster.

In the early 1950s, the community had approximately 200 residents. Today, the population is significantly smaller.

References

Unincorporated communities in Mississippi
Unincorporated communities in Neshoba County, Mississippi